Mercedes 5 and Dime is the third studio album released by the Canadian alternative rock band Moist. Released in Canada on June 29, 1999, and in the United States a year later, it includes the hits "Breathe" and "Underground". The album debuted at #7 on the Billboard Canadian Albums chart. 

The album was released with different album covers for the Canadian and United States releases.  The United States version has a yellow album cover while the Canadian release's cover is dark blue. This was Moist's last studio album before their 12-year hiatus began in 2001.

The track listings of the two releases also differ — the Canadian version contains the tracks "Mike Hammer" and "Liberation", while the U.S. release includes a re-recording of the band's 1994 hit "Push".

The album also contains an unlisted bonus track, entitled "Deliver Me".

On the Canadian release, both spines spell the album title as "Mercedes Five and Dime", matching the front cover, suggesting that this is the official spelling of the album's title. The spelling "MERCEDES 5 AND DIME" is wrapped around the front and back covers (with "DIME" and "MER" on the back), while the traycard behind the disc has an image that spells the album title as "MERCEDES 5 & DIME".

Mercedes 5 and Dime was nominated for "Best Rock Album" at the 2000 Juno Awards.

Track listings

Canadian Release
 "Underground" – 4:54
 "Dogs" – 4:32
 "Breathe" – 4:46
 "Fish" – 4:08
 "Comes and Goes" – 3:54
 "Mike Hammer" – 4:30
 "Tonight" – 4:06
 "Alive" – 4:35
 "Pleasing Falsetto" – 4:15
 "Mandolin" – 3:39
 "Place" – 3:58
 "Liberation" – 4:51
 "Deliver Me" – 3:07

US Release
 "Underground" - 4:56
 "Push" - 3:52
 "Breathe" - 4:52
 "Fish" - 4:08
 "Comes And Goes" - 3:54
 "Dogs" - 4:32
 "Alive" - 4:36
 "Tonight" - 4:06
 "Pleasing Falsetto" - 4:15
 "Mandolin" - 3:38
 "Place" - 3:58
 "Deliver Me" - 3:09

"Breathe" is featured on the album Big Shiny Tunes 4, as well as the soundtrack for the film Stir Of Echoes.

"Deliver Me" has a stray 14 kHz tone throughout. It is unknown where this noise came from.

Singles
Breathe
Underground
Comes and Goes (radio edit)

Credits
David Usher - vocals
Jeff Pearce - bass
Mark Makoway - guitar
Kevin Young - keyboard/piano
Paul Wilcox - drums

References

1999 albums
Moist (Canadian band) albums
Albums produced by David Leonard (record producer)